The Ordnungsbehörde or Department of Order is a municipal-level law enforcement agency in some States of Germany which has the duty to avert hazards that are endangering the public security or order. The most apparent Ordnungsbehörde is the Ordnungsamt, whose tasks usually include handing out warnings and tickets for petty offenses.

Notes

Specialist law enforcement agencies of Germany